Dracontomelon duperreanum or Indochina Dragonplum is a tree species Anacardiaceae, with no subspecies listed in the Catalogue of Life.

It is found in southern China (Yunnan, Guangxi, Guangdong) and Vietnam (especially in the north - centre); its name in Vietnamese is long cóc, sấu trắng or simply sấu.

Uses
The fruits of the Indochina Dragonplum tree are used in Vietnamese cuisine, often preserved with souring agents or cooked with duck. After being preserved in sugar, it can be used to make a cooling drink in summer.

Exportation 
On August 3rd 2021, Vietnam exported 22 tons of the fruit to Australia.

Gallery

References

External links 
 
	

Flora of Indo-China
Trees of Vietnam
duperreanum